Joseph Leo Toth (born September 1973) is an American lawyer who serves as a judge of the United States Court of Appeals for Veterans Claims. He is a veteran of the Navy's Judge Advocate General's Corps.

Early life and education 

Toth received his Bachelor of Arts from the University of Chicago and his Juris Doctor from the Ave Maria School of Law.

Military service 
Toth is a veteran of the U.S. Navy's Judge Advocate General's Corps. In 2011, he served as a field officer in Afghanistan, where he was stationed with the United States Army's 10th Mountain Division in the Zhari District. Toth partnered with Afghan prosecutors to establish the rule of law in the district where the Taliban was formed. He was awarded the Joint Service Commendation Medal.

Toth also served as a senior defense counsel at Naval Station Pearl Harbor, defending service members at courts-martial.

Career 

Toth clerked for Judge Robert J. Conrad of the United States District Court for the Western District of North Carolina and Judge Daniel Anthony Manion of the United States Court of Appeals for the Seventh Circuit.

Toth served as an associate federal public defender in Milwaukee, Wisconsin.

Court of Appeals for Veterans Claims 

On June 7, 2017, President Donald Trump nominated Toth to serve as a Judge of the United States Court of Appeals for Veterans Claims. A hearing on his nomination before the Senate Veterans Affairs Committee was held on July 19, 2017. On July 20, 2017, the committee voted to report his nomination. His nomination was confirmed by the Senate with a voice vote on August 3, 2017.

References

External links 
 
 Biography at U.S. Court of Appeals for Veterans Claims

1973 births
Living people
20th-century American lawyers
21st-century American lawyers
21st-century American judges
Ave Maria School of Law alumni
United States Navy Judge Advocate General's Corps
Judges of the United States Court of Appeals for Veterans Claims
Public defenders
United States Article I federal judges appointed by Donald Trump
University of Chicago alumni
Wisconsin lawyers